Maidstone Park is a cricket and football ground in Upper Hutt, Wellington, New Zealand.  

A single List A match was held there during the 1978/79 Gillette Cup when Wellington played Canterbury, which resulted in a 4 wicket victory by Canterbury.  The following season a first-class match was held there between Wellington and Central Districts in the 1979/80 Shell Trophy, which resulted in an innings and 45 runs victory for Wellington.

Upper Hutt City FC also use Maidstone Park as their home ground with their club rooms based in front of the turf.

References

External links
Maidstone Park at ESPNcricinfo
Maidstone Park at CricketArchive

Cricket grounds in New Zealand
Sports venues in the Wellington Region